Tyra Axnér (born 18 March 2002) is a Swedish handball player who plays for Nykøbing Falster and the Swedish national team.

She represented Sweden at the 2019 European Women's U-17 Handball Championship, were she received silver. She also participated at the 2021 Women's U-19 European Handball Championship.

She is the daughter of the Swedish women's national team coach and former handball player Tomas Axnér. She was born in Minden in Germany, as her father was active playing in GWD Minden at the time.

Individual awards
 All-Star Team Best Left Back of the Youth European Championship: 2019

References

2002 births
Living people
Swedish female handball players
Lugi HF players
People from Minden
Sportspeople from Detmold (region)
Swedish expatriate sportspeople in Denmark
Expatriate handball players
21st-century Swedish women